Susan Mae Elizabeth Medley, professionally known as Siouxsie Medley, is an American musician, artist, and actress from Los Angeles, California. She is best known as the lead guitarist for Dead Sara, a band she founded with Emily Armstrong in 2005.

Early years
Born in Los Angeles to Stan Medley and Sandra Sherman. Medley was raised by her father after her parents separated. Medley's interest in music began at age 9 when she started practicing on a Fender Telecaster owned by her nanny, Dexy Valentine of the band Magic Wands. She then used two years’ worth of saved allowances to purchase her own guitar, a Fender Squier, at age 11.

Medley started acting at age 12 when she won a part in an international commercial. The commercial played mostly in Europe and Medley became a SAG actress as a result. She was pursuing an acting career until she met Emily Armstrong in 2002 and the two began writing songs together.

Dead Sara
Medley and Armstrong first performed live in March 2005 at The Mint nightclub in Los Angeles, under the name Epiphany. Later that year they changed their band's name to Dead Sara as a reference to the Fleetwood Mac song "Sara" and its lyric "...said Sara", sometimes heard as "dead Sara". Armstrong and Medley have cited Stevie Nicks, who wrote "Sara", as a primary influence. Around this time, Medley began styling her first name as "Siouxsie", as a nod to the Sioux Indians tribe and the Native American heritage of one of her great-grandparents (rather than a reference to the musical artist Siouxsie Sioux).

Dead Sara has since released two full-length albums and several EPs, most recently Temporary Things Taking Up Space in 2018.

Accolades 
In 2012, Medley was the only woman among the 10 finalists for the Loudwire rock guitarist of the year award. As of 2017, Medley is the only female guitarist ever named as a guitarist of the year finalist in the Loudwire annual awards.

Medley composed the artwork for the Dead Sara single "Heart Shaped Box", which Sony Computer Entertainment commissioned for the cover of its Infamous Second Son video game.

References

Living people
People from Los Angeles
1986 births